Vascular endothelial growth factor receptor 1 is a protein that in humans is encoded by the FLT1 gene.

Function 

FLT1 is a member of VEGF receptor gene family. It encodes a receptor tyrosine kinase which is activated by VEGF-A, VEGF-B, and placental growth factor. The sequence structure of the FLT1 gene resembles that of the FMS (now CSF1R) gene; hence, Yoshida et al. (1987) proposed the name FLT as an acronym for FMS-like tyrosine kinase.

The ablation of VEGFR1 by chemical and genetic means has also recently been found to augment the conversion of white adipose tissue to brown adipose tissue as well as increase brown adipose angiogenesis in mice.

Functional genetic variation in FLT1 (rs9582036) has been found to affect non-small cell lung cancer survival.

Interactions 

FLT1 has been shown to interact with PLCG1 and vascular endothelial growth factor B (VEGF-B).

See also 
 VEGF receptors

References

Further reading 

 
 
 
 
 
 
 
 
 
 
 

Tyrosine kinase receptors